Milford Township is one of eleven townships in LaGrange County, Indiana. As of the 2010 census, its population was 2,868 and it contained 1,707 housing units.

Milford Township was established in 1837.

Geography

Unincorporated towns
 Elmira
 Lakeside Park
 Meadow Shores Park
 Mount Pisgah
 South Milford
 Stroh

(This list is based on USGS data and may include former settlements.)

References

External links
 Indiana Township Association
 United Township Association of Indiana

Townships in LaGrange County, Indiana
Townships in Indiana